The 1908–09 Kangaroo tour of Great Britain was the first ever such tour for the newly-formed Australia national rugby league team (or 'The Kangaroos'). The tour was to England and Wales and coincided with the first Wallabies Rugby Union tour of Great Britain, which in hindsight put the Kangaroos in a tough position. The game of rugby league was not yet twelve months old in Australia however a New Zealand side had already toured to Britain (the All Golds in 1907), Australia had encountered New Zealand during the 1908 season and the pioneer Australian leaders of the game were keen to match up against the Northern Union founders of the code.

The 1908–09 Kangaroos wore jumpers of sky blue and maroon representing the New South Wales Blues and Queensland Maroons players that comprised the team. The first Kangaroo tour was considered a financial failure, with poor weather and economic conditions contributing to smaller than expected gate takings. Tour promoter James Giltinan was bankrupted as  result.  However for almost a century afterward, Kangaroo tours took place every four years and involved a three-Test Ashes series against Great Britain (under the name Northern Union) and a number of tour matches. The 1908-09 tour was later depicted in the 1988 Australian television movie The First Kangaroos.

The tour

Itinerary
The Kangaroos sailed for Britain on RMS Macedonia prior to the close of the 1908 NSWRFL season, denying some of the selected players to appear in the inaugural grand final. They worked as stokers to keep their fitness levels up as well as doing daily sessions in the ship's gymnasium and boxing ring. The jerseys were coloured sky blue and maroon, combining the state colours of NSW and Queensland respectively. When tour captain, Lutge was injured early in the tour, Messenger became captain in the 1st and 2nd Test Matches. After he was injured, Alec Burdon assumed the captaincy for the 3rd Test. One of the players Pat Walsh sailed to Britain separately on the ship, Salamis and brought the live Kangaroo mascot with him. Walsh arrived in England for the 5th match of the tour against Salford.The team's live marsupial mascot died before the end of the tour due to the execrable weather.

The Kangaroos scored some memorable victories, including wins against Yorkshire, Lancashire and Hunslet (featuring their fearsome forwards "The Terrible Six"). Rugby league made its first appearance in Scotland in 1909 when Glasgow’s Celtic Park hosted a game between the Northern Rugby Football Union representative side and the touring Australians.

Results
Matches played: 45 Won: 17 Drew: 6 Lost: 22 
The Ashes: Great Britain 2-0.
Leading try scorers of the tour were Devereaux 17, Messenger 10, Frawley 10, Walsh 9, Courtney 8.
Dally Messenger was the tourists' leading point-scorer with 160, a full 103 points clear of next highest-scorer.

Financial difficulties
The seven-month tour proved to be a true test of survival and was almost a disaster due to small gate-takings. A crippling cotton mill strike in northern England made it difficult for many fans to afford their way through the turnstiles and there was criticism of the entry price the Australians wanted to charge. Australian morale ebbed during one of the meanest northern winters on record. 

Giltinan as promoter of the tour had borrowed £2,000 to fund the operation and took the full risk. He paid the players a weekly allowance of one pound early in the tour but before long it was cut to ten shillings. Things eventually became so bad that the team would travel on overnight trains to save on accommodation. The players had sailed from Sydney on one-way fares and the Northern Union had to pay the players' fares home. Later, evidence emerged that Giltinan lost £418 on the campaign and was bankrupted on his return to Sydney.

Aftermath
Peter Moir a seminal figure in the foundation of the Glebe club  had an unhappy tour and played in only four games and no Tests. At tour's end he wrote a letter home, The team is run by a clique and you are picked by them. I am very disappointed at not getting a game. It is very hard as all my people live here and they keep asking me why I am not playing and I cannot tell them a lie. 

Deane, Walsh, Frawley, Devereux, McCabe and Rosenfeld all stayed behind to play in the wintry Northern Union competition when the Australians boarded the RMS Seuvic for the journey home. On the return journey Messenger met and fell in love with Annie Macauley whom he would marry. Also while en route back to Australia, secretary J. J. Giltinan, president Henry Hoyle and treasurer, Victor Trumper, the men who had done most to form the NSWRL, were being voted out of it.

Touring party

Tour management
Tour manager: James Giltinan Giltinan had borrowed £2,000 to fund the entire tour as promoter. He was one of the founders of the breakaway code's Australian formation in Sydney a year earlier. 
Assistant manager: John Fihelly
  Fihelly was one of the code's founders in Queensland. He had represented for Queensland in rugby union and in the state's first representative league side in May 1908. He was a state selector that year. He did not play any matches on tour & performed the role of Assistant Manager. He would later referee many matches of the 1909 Brisbane club competition & a 1910 Test match.  
Tour secretary: Bill Noble
 Selected as a player, Noble the 1908 Newtown club captain was injured early and made only three tour match appearances. He performed the role of Secretary/Treasurer, managing the tour's scarce finances.  
Tour captain: Denis Lutge  A rugged North Sydney forward North who worked as a stevedore, Lutge was elected Tour Captain by his team-mates shortly after the squad set sail from Sydney.  He had captained Australia in the 3rd ever Test match against New Zealand in June 1908. Lutge broke his arm early in the tour and appeared in only five tour matches and no Tests.   
Test captains: Dally Messenger & Alex Burdon   Lutge's deputy as tour vice-captain, Messenger stepped up to lead Australia in the first two Tests, scoring all of Australian's points in the 2nd. A knee injury from attempting field goals kept him out of the 3rd Test.  Burdon was one of the founders of the Glebe club and its first captain. He was a selector on the 1908 tour and selected himself in two Tests and 24 tour matches. He led Australia in the 3rd Test.

Touring squad

Test matches

First Test

Great Britain led 14-5 at half-time and stretched to 17-5 before Australia began their fightback spearheaded by Devereaux's three ties. They led 22-20 in the dying minutes before Great Britain snatched a draw with a penalty goal.

Second Test

Third Test

A heavy pitch limited scoring opportunities and Great Britain went to the half-time break with a three nil lead. Australia's defence was solid throughout the second half and when Frawley scored for Devereaux to convert they took the lead. However, with Australian centre Bill Heidke off the field having a dislocated shoulder put back in place, Oldham winger George Tyson scored late in the match and secured The Ashes for Great Britain for the first time.

References

Sources
 Whiticker, Alan(2004) Captaining the Kangaroos, New Holland, Sydney
 Whiticker, Alan & Hudson, Glen (2006) The Encyclopedia of Rugby League Players, Gavin Allen Publishing, Sydney
 Andrews, Malcolm (2006) The ABC of Rugby League Austn Broadcasting Corpn, Sydney
 Heads, Ian and Middleton, David (2008) A Centenary of Rugby League, MacMillan Sydney
1908/09 Kangaroo Tour to Great Britain at rlhalloffame.org.uk
1908/09 Kangaroo Tour of Great Britain at rl1908.com
Australia's First 'Ashes' Team at rl1908.com
Touring With The 1908 Pioneers at rl1908.com
Ashes Series 1908/09 at rugbyleagueproject.org

Kangaroo Tour
Kangaroo Tour
Australia national rugby league team tours
Great
Kan
Rugby league tours of Great Britain
1908 in Welsh rugby league
1909 in Welsh rugby league